The Thailand national basketball team represents Thailand in international basketball.

Performances

Summer Olympics

FIBA Asia Cup

SEA Games
1977 : 
1979 : ?
1981 : 
1983 : 
1985 : 
1987 : 
1989 : 
1991 : 
1993 : 
1995 : 
1997 : 
1999 : 
2001 : 4th
2003 : 
2007 : 4th
2011 : 
2013 : 
2015 : 4th
2017 : 
2019 : 
2021 :

Southeast Asian Championship
1994 : 
1996 : did not participate 
1998 : 
2001 : 
2003 : 
2005 :  
2007 : 4th
2009 : did not participate
2011 : did not participate
2013 : 
2015 : did not participate
2017 :

Roster

Past rosters
Scroll down to see more.
Roster in 2011:

Roster at the 2013 FIBA Asia Championship.

Roster at the 2016 FIBA Asia Challenge.

|}
| valign="top" |
 Head coach

 Assistant coach

Legend
(C) Team captain
Club field describes current pro club
|}

Roster at the SEA Games 2017.

|}
| valign="top" |
 Head coach

  

Legend
(C) Team captain
Club field describes current pro club
|}

Roster at the FIBA Asia Cup 2021 SEABA Pre-Qualifier.

|}
| valign="top" |
 Head coach

  
  

Legend
(C) Team captain
Club field describes current pro club
|}

See also
Thailand women's national basketball team
Thailand national under-19 basketball team

References

External links
Thailand Basketball records at FIBA archive
Asia-basket – Thailand Men National Team

 
Men's national basketball teams
 
1953 establishments in Thailand